The Hospital of St. John (Oud Sint-Janshospitaal) was a medieval hospital in Bruges. It was founded in the mid-12th century. 

Located next to the Church of Our Lady, the premises contain some of Europe's oldest surviving hospital buildings. The hospital grew during the Middle Ages and was a place where sick pilgrims and travellers were cared for. The site was later expanded with the building of a monastery and convent. In the 19th century, further construction led to a hospital with eight wards around a central building.

Not until 1977 did the building's function as a hospital stop, at which time it was moved to a newer modern hospital in Brugge Sint-Pieters. The city of Bruges took over the buildings. Today part of the hospital complex holds the popular Hans Memling museum, named for the German-born Early Netherlandish painter, where a number of works, such as triptychs are displayed, as well as hospital records, medical instruments and other works of art.

The hospital site is also used as a congress and exhibition centre, the site Oud Sint-Jan.

References

External links
 
 Sint-Janshospitaal museum visitor information
 Site Oud Sint-Jan congress centre

Hospitals in Belgium
Museums in Bruges
Hospital buildings completed in the 11th century
Brick Gothic
Gothic architecture in Belgium
Hospitals established in the 12th century